Berresford is a surname. Notable people with the surname include:

Susan Berresford (born 1943), American foundation executive
Virginia Berresford (1902–1995), American painter, printmaker, and art gallery owner

See also
Beresford (name)
Berrisford